The Broad Creek Soapstone Quarries, also known as Orr Prehistoric Steatite Quarry Archeological Site, is an archeological site located near Dublin, just south of Whiteford, Harford County, Maryland.  The site includes evidence of the manufacture of vessels from boulders instead of from bedrock.  This activity dated from 1700 to 1000 B.C.

It was listed on the National Register of Historic Places in 1975.

References

External links
, including photo from 1981, at Maryland Historical Trust website

Quarries in the United States
Archaeological sites in Harford County, Maryland
Archaeological sites on the National Register of Historic Places in Maryland
Native American history of Maryland
National Register of Historic Places in Harford County, Maryland